Homewrecker is an American reality show on MTV that was hosted by Jackass star Ryan Dunn. The show is a twist on home renovation reality shows such as Trading Spaces and Extreme Makeover: Home Edition; but instead of the room being renovated, it is wrecked.

Plot
To qualify for Homewrecker, a participant had to submit to the show a story of how he or she was victimized by one of their friends. Each segment opened with the "victim" explaining to Ryan Dunn what happened to them. Dunn then observed the offender to get additional ideas on what to do.  Finally, Dunn and a team of helpers helped the participant redo their friend's room to fit what the evildoer had done.

The show had two segments, where two separate people get revenge on friends who had recently offended them by trashing their bedrooms. There were short clips in between scenes where the late host Dunn taught the viewer how to perform similar pranks at home. The clips were shot in the style of 1950s training videos.

Episodes

References

External links
Homewrecker on MTV.com
 

2005 American television series debuts
2005 American television series endings
2000s American reality television series
English-language television shows
MTV original programming
Jackass (TV series)
CKY